Additional Secretary (often abbreviated as AS, GoI or Union Additional Secretary or Additional Secretary to Government of India) is a post and a rank under the Central Staffing Scheme of the Government of India. The authority for creation of this post solely rests with Cabinet of India.

Additional secretary is mostly a career civil servant, generally from the Indian Administrative Service, and is a government official of high seniority. The civil servants who hold this rank are either from All India Services (on deputation; on tenure, after empanelment) or Central Civil Services (Group A; on empanelment). All promotions and appointments to this rank and post are directly made by the Appointments Committee of the Cabinet.

In the functioning of Government of India, an additional secretary is the administrative head of a wing in a department. Additional secretaries — on deputation — can senior positions at the United Nations, like as India's permanent representative to UNESCO.

The post is somewhat analogous to a principal secretary in a state government. But because of seniority, office-bearers can hold senior positions like as that of additional chief secretary to a state government, and in Union Territories, they can hold the position of Chief Secretary of a UT government.

Additional secretaries in the Union Government is somewhat analogous to lieutenant general (Level 15/HAG) and equivalent ranks in Indian Armed Forces, but the rank of lieutenant general is placed above on the order of precedence. 

Additional secretaries rank 25th on Order of Precedence of India

History 
Sir Richard Tottenham, ICS had once expressed "In my opinion there is, or should be, no distinction of function, but only of pay between a joint and an additional secretary. Additional and joint secretaries should not be either chief secretaries or deputy secretaries."

Powers, responsibilities and postings 

Additional secretary is the overall in charge with the necessary measure of independent functioning and responsibility of the wing of the department allocated and entrusted to him. An additional secretary in charge of administration also exercises all administrative powers as head of the department wing of the ministry/department.

Additional secretaries and joint secretaries are responsible for filing all affidavits and responses before the Supreme Court of India.

The Prime Minister of India is the final authority on posting and transfer of officers of additional secretary level. Additional secretaries report to their departmental secretary and ministerial/departmental cabinet minister.

Position 
In the Union government, the members head department wings in the departments and ministries of Union Government.

Government nominated Board members in the Central Public Sector Enterprises/Public Sector Undertakings are either of the rank of additional secretary or joint secretary.

According to the Seventh Central Pay Commission of India, IAS officers hold 98 out of 107 positions of additional secretary in the Government of India.

Emolument, accommodation and perks 

All additional secretaries to Government of India are eligible for a diplomatic passport. They are allotted Type-V (D-II and D-I) and Type-VI (C-II) apartments in areas like New Moti Bagh across Delhi by the Ministry of Urban Development (Directorate of Estates).

The salary and emolument in this rank is equivalent to principal secretary to a state government and lieutenant general (Level 15/HAG) and equivalent ranks in Indian Armed Forces.

Reforms and challenges 
Non-IAS civil services have complained to Government of India because of lack of empanelment in the rank/post of additional secretary on numerous occasions.

References

Bibliography 

 
 
 
 

Civil Services of India
Indian Administrative Service officers
Indian Foreign Service officers
Indian government officials
Indian Police Service officers